The purple grenadier (Granatina ianthinogaster) is a common species of estrildid finch found in eastern Africa.

Description
The length averages 13.3 cm (5.25 in).  All ages and sexes have a black tail, and adults have a red bill.  The male has a cinnamon-colored head and neck with a blue patch surrounding the eye.  The rump is purplish blue and the underparts are violet-blue with variable rufous patches.  The female is smaller and mostly cinnamon brown with white barring on the underparts and silver-blue eyepatches.  Juveniles are like females, but mostly unbarred tawny-brown with a reddish-brown bill.

The song (in Kenya) is described as "a high, thin chit-cheet tsereea-ee-ee tsit-tsit, or cheerer cheet tsee-tsee sur-chit."

The phylogeny has been obtained by Antonio Arnaiz-Villena et al.

Range and habitat
It is found in subtropical and tropical (lowland) dry shrubland in Ethiopia, Kenya, Somalia, South Sudan, Tanzania and Uganda, an estimated global extent of occurrence of 1,500,000 km2. The status of the species is evaluated as Least Concern.

Origin
Origin and phylogeny has been obtained by Antonio Arnaiz-Villena et al. Estrildinae may have originated in India and dispersed thereafter (towards Africa and Pacific Ocean habitats).

References

purple grenadier
Birds of East Africa
purple grenadier